, also written as 2006 HH123, was a misidentified nonexistent object that had a short 1 day observation arc. It was formerly thought to be a lost object with an assumed eccentricity of 0.46. If it had been a scattered-disc object it would have had an absolute magnitude of 5.2, and been a possible dwarf planet. The preliminary orbital elements (as displayed in the infobox to the right) were calculated using only three observations over a period of one day; hence its orbit was very poorly known and it quickly became lost.

Of the three discovery images, the first one is an unidentified object, the second one was identified as the main-belt asteroid , and the third image shows nothing at the measured position.

See also 
 – misidentified as a large TNO on discovery, turned out to be a sub-kilometer main-belt asteroid
330 Adalberta – another misidentified nonexistent object (the name was later reused for an object that actually exists)

References

External links 
 (Deleted) 

Lost minor planets
Minor planet object articles (unnumbered)
20060426